The 5mm Clement is a centerfire cartridge produced for early self-loading pocket pistols made by Charola-Anitua and a 1903 design by Clement.  The steeply conical, bottle-necked case is semi-rimmed, but headspaces on the shoulder of the case.  The long bullet was inadequately stabilized and tended to tumble in flight.  The Charola-Anitua pistol was produced in very limited numbers, and Clement pistol production shifted to the .25 ACP cartridge after 1906.

References

Pistol and rifle cartridges